The Santa Anita Handicap is an American Thoroughbred horse race held annually in early March at Santa Anita Park in Arcadia, California. It is a Grade I race for horses four years old and up and was once considered the most important race for older horses in North America during the winter racing season.  The ten-furlong Santa Anita Handicap currently offers a purse of $500,000.

History
The first race was held in 1935, just months after the track opened in late 1934, and the event was open to three-year-olds and up until 1969. The Santa Anita Handicap instantly became one of the nation's top races because it offered a minimum purse of $100,000, then a staggering amount for a horse race. In its early years, the race was most commonly referred to among horsemen and racing media as the "Hundred-Grander."  Another nickname for the race dating back to that time, "The Big 'Cap", is still in regular use.

Probably the dominant figure in the early years of the race was Seabiscuit, as the race proved to be a metaphor for his career.  In his first two attempts to win it in 1937 and 1938, he lost in photo finishes, with the second loss to a horse carrying 30 pounds less than he was.  He suffered what was believed to be a career-ending injury while preparing for the 1939 edition. He came back to run in the Hundred-Grander in 1940, finally winning in his last race.

The 2019 race was postponed from early March to early April due to Santa Anita's safety-related suspension of live racing.

Records
Speed record:
 1:58.17 – Game On Dude (2014)

Most wins:
 3 – Game On Dude (2011, 2013, 2014)

Most wins by a jockey:
 11 – Bill Shoemaker (1954, 1955, 1958, 1961, 1966, 1967, 1971, 1975, 1980, 1982, 1985)

Most wins by a trainer:
 9 – Charlie Whittingham (1957, 1967, 1971, 1973, 1975, 1985, 1986, 1990, 1993)

Most wins by an owner:
 3 – Charles S. Howard (1939, 1940, 1950)
 3 – Lanni Family Trust, Mercedes Stable & Bernard C. Schiappa (2011, 2013, 2014)
 3 – Hronis Racing LLC (2018, 2019, 2020)

Winners

 † In 1952, Intent won the race but was disqualified to second place.
 † In 1982, Perrault won the race but was disqualified to second place.
 † In 1994, The Wicked North won the race but was disqualified to fourth place.

Notes

External links 

Santa Anita Handicap at Pedigree Query

Horse races in California
Santa Anita Park
Open middle distance horse races
Grade 1 stakes races in the United States
Recurring sporting events established in 1935
1935 establishments in California